Terry Leon Wright (born July 17, 1964) is a former American football defensive back who played two seasons with the Indianapolis Colts of the National Football League. He first enrolled at Scottsdale Community College before transferring to Temple University. He attended South Mountain High School in Phoenix, Arizona. Wright was also a member of the Cleveland Browns, Oklahoma City Twisters and Hamilton Tiger-Cats. His brother Toby Wright also played in the NFL.

College career

Scottsdale Community College
Wright first played college football for the Scottsdale Fighting Artichokes.

Temple University
Wright then transferred to play for the Temple Owls. In 1986, he recorded 42 tackles, two fumbles recoveries, four interceptions and an 80-yard interception return for a touchdown.

Professional career

Cleveland Browns
Wright signed with the Cleveland Browns after going undrafted in the 1987 NFL Draft. He was released by the Browns after summer camp.

Indianapolis Colts
Wright was signed by the Indianapolis Colts during the 1987 NFL players' strike and played in 13 games, starting two, for the team during the 1987 season. He played in eight games for the Colts in 1988.

Oklahoma City Twisters
Wright played for the Oklahoma City Twisters of the Minor League Football System in 1990.

Hamilton Tiger-Cats
Wright played in 54 games for the Hamilton Tiger-Cats from 1991 to 1994.

References

External links
Just Sports Stats

Living people
1964 births
Players of American football from Phoenix, Arizona
American football defensive backs
Canadian football defensive backs
African-American players of American football
African-American players of Canadian football
Scottsdale Fighting Artichokes football players
Temple Owls football players
Indianapolis Colts players
Hamilton Tiger-Cats players
Sportspeople from Phoenix, Arizona
National Football League replacement players
21st-century African-American people
20th-century African-American sportspeople